Charles Delanglade (1870–1952) was a French sculptor.

References

1870 births
1952 deaths
Sculptors from Marseille
20th-century French sculptors
French male sculptors